Yuvalak is a village in the Tefenni District of Burdur Province in Turkey. Its population is 88 (2021).

References

Villages in Tefenni District